The following is a list of terms used in relation to age, especially old age, with negative connotations. With more recent recognition of ageism and age discrimination, terms such as "senile", "okay, boomer" and "demented" are often criticized in modern usage as offensive to aging people, used to shut down political and social opinions of aging people, or mocking disabilities that can come with old age, such as Alzheimer's disease and dementia. Many ageist or age-negative terms are intersectional with ableism. Consideration of such terms as offensive or harmful may depend on the context in which they are used; for example, the slang term "boomer" can have both positive and negative connotations depending on the usage. A large number of these terms are United States slang that emerged in the midst of the COVID-19 pandemic and the presidency of Donald Trump, owing to a noticeable and growing age gap between conservative and liberal adults of voting age; likewise, a number of age-related comments have been used to mock President Joe Biden. Style guides such as the "Age Writing Guide" by the University of Bristol have been implemented in some institutions and academic circles to attempt to eliminate the use of ageist terms in academic writing.

Films such as Fried Green Tomatoes, as well as sitcoms and TV shows such as All in the Family and The Golden Girls, have challenged some of these terms and how they are used in relation to describing and depicting older people. In addition, fictional characters such as Dorothy, Sophia, Rose and Blanche from The Golden Girls, and Burdine Maxwell from Bratz, have served as strong examples of women who have faced ageist insults and negative age-related terms, but who overcame them in the workplace.

This list is non-exhaustive and may not reflect all terminology. List is in alphabetical order.

Terms

A 

Adorable: A term that, when specifically applied to an older person or a senior citizen, is considered patronizing and mocking in nature, particularly if the term is being used to refer to mental disabilities or dependency
 Adult diaper: A type of disposable diaper or underpants for adults who struggle with urinary or fecal incontinence or other medical issues that affect bladder and bowel control; it is recommended by groups such as AgingCare that nurses and other professional care staff not use the term "diaper" due to its connotation with infants and children; preferred terms are adult descriptors such as "briefs", "panties", or the product's brand name, for example Depends
Adulting: A slang term associating typical adult behaviour with difficulty and hardship, growing up and maturity whereas adults who aren't "adulting" are immature and childish
Alligator bait, gator bait: A racist slur used to describe black children and young people, comparing their worth to bait used to catch alligators; the term gator bait was banned from a common cheer in Florida due to its offensive meaning, and is generally no longer used except as a racial slur 
Ancient: An insulting term to refer to an older person or senior citizen

B 
Baba Yaga: A Slavic mythological figure and slang term referring to a creepy or unsightly old woman, older person who frightens or upsets children
Baby: Term often used to tease others for being childish or too young, or for behaving in an immature way
Bag lady: A homeless old woman or a vagrant
Barely legal: A term often used to market pornography as featuring young people who are "barely legal" (only just reached legal age of majority; still look like minors); the term is often considered creepy and inappropriate, and fetishizes young people sexually
Bed blocker: A derogatory term in Irish slang used to describe older people taking up all the available hospital beds in the healthcare system
Beldame: An outdated term referring to an old woman, especially an ugly one
Biddy: An annoying, gossipy or interfering old lady
Blue-hairs: Derogatory term referring to old women who dye their hair a distinctive silvery-blue colour; suburban older women
Boomer: A postwar era-born person from the "Baby Boom", or a "baby boomer"; this term can also be used in a neutral context sometimes
Boomer Remover: A slang term used by politically left-leaning young people on social media to describe the COVID-19 pandemic; the term drew criticism for trivializing and mocking the high death rates of aging people due to the pandemic
Boomerang kid: A term for an adult who ceases to live independently from their parents and moves back home, typically derogatory 
Brat: A term used to describe a badly-behaved or spoiled child, often used to scold them (the term has been reclaimed as one of edginess or rebellion; for instance, the fashion doll line Bratz uses the term in a positive manner)
Burden: A term (also ableist) of contempt or disdain used to describe old and infirm or disabled people who either don't contribute to society or who contribute in a limited way; this lack of contribution may be imposed or facilitated by social stigma and other factors

C 

Codger: An old-fashioned or eccentric old man
Coot: A crazy and foolish old man; senile man
Cougar: A western slang term referring to older women who have romantic or sexual relations with younger men
Crone: An ugly or witch-like old woman
Curmudgeon: An ill-tempered, grumpy or surly old man (although the term is most often applied to old men, it can be used more broadly: for example, in the 2008 film Marley & Me, John Grogan, a forty-year-old man, is called a curmudgeon for complaining about the prevalence of aesthetically ugly high-rise condos popping up in his city)

D 
Deaf: An ageist and ableist (when used as an insult) term used to mock people who are hard of hearing or who misheard something; synonymous with "stupid" or "dumb" in the context of an insult (note that the term "deaf" is also a legitimate medical and demographic term used for the Deaf Community, and is generally neutral or positive unless used as a direct insult or mockery)
Demented: An older person suffering from dementia or Alzheimer's disease
Dinosaur: Slang term used to describe an out-of-touch older person, a clueless person or an ignorant and bigoted old man
Dirty old man: An old pervert, specifically referring to older men who make sexual advances or remarks, or who often engage in sex-related activities and subject matter
Dotard: A weak older person with limited mental faculties, or a mentally disabled older person
Dried up: Slang for a sexually-inactive older person, often used to refer to older women or impotent men

E 
Eat All The Old People: A phrase popularized by the song of the same name by the music group No Time of "Dr. Demento's Basement Tapes No. 7"; the song, intended as satire, mocks deafness in older people, and features lyrics depicting a fictional political campaign endorsing the killing and eating of senior citizens so that society will have more resources; the song features the chorus "We gotta eat all the old people (Show em that you love em), We gotta eat all the old people (Shove em in the oven), We gotta eat all the old people (Stick em in the freezer), We gotta eat all the old people (We're gonna garnish up a geezer)!"
Empty nesters: Older people with children who have moved out of the family residence; people downsizing

F 

Failure to launch: A term referring to a young adult who has not yet met the societal standards of their culture for being a typical adult, such as going to university, moving to their own residence or getting a job
Fogey: An old man who has old-fashioned or conservative interests and tastes
Fuddy-duddy: A silly or foolish old man

G 

Geezer: A significantly aged old man
Geriatric: Offensive slang (when used in a non-medical context only)
Gerry: (Not to be confused with the pejorative ethnic term towards German people; "gerry" in this context is short for "geriatric")
Gigolo: A young man or boy who earns money or favours (such as a free room) from a romantic or sexual relationship with an older woman; a young male escort; this is a legitimate descriptive term, but can also be used as an insult towards any younger man who gets money or affection from older women or multiple women 
GILF, or, "Grandmother I'd Like to Fuck": A fetishistic acronym referring to sexually-attractive older women
Gold-digger: A younger person, typically a woman, who seduces and then gets money, affection and possessions from an older person; the term can also have criminal implications
Golden ager: A term used to describe older people, especially those retired or close to old age
Golden Girls: A group of older women who are friends; originates from the term "golden years", and from the 1980s sitcom The Golden Girls
Guang Gun: A derogatory Chinese slang term loosely translating to "bare branches" or "bare sticks", used to describe unmarried men who have no legitimate children and therefore don't carry on the family tree or family name; the male equivalent of "spinster" or "Sheng nu"

H 

Hag: A bitter, mean and physically ugly older woman 
Harold and Maude: A couple consisting of two partners between whom exists a large age gap; slang term originates from the 1971 comedy feature film Harold and Maude
Harridan: A slang term for an old woman who is vicious, scolding and cruel
Has-been: An older person out-of-touch with modern trends, or outmoded and no longer wanted/needed by their place of employment or society
Having a "senior moment": A temporary mental lapse jokingly attributed to senility or old age
Hipster: A term (often pejorative) referring to young people who are pretentious and heavily focused on keeping up with certain high-end fashion and lifestyle choices

J 

Jailbait: A term in pedophile slang used to identify a teenage girl or boy who is under the age of consent as a sexual object; used as a descriptor or a warning among sex offenders and pedophiles to identify a potential victim or attractive victim

K 

Kidult: An adult with an interest in childish things and things from childhood that they are nostalgic for; for example, a grown man with no children who plays with My Little Pony figurines or sleeps with plush toys

L 

Little old lady: A harmless and helpless older woman; innocent and pitiful older woman
Lolita: A term for a sexually-mature or promiscuous minor child, typically a girl; the term has pedophilic connotations and is generally considered inappropriate and creepy, used to fetishize or exploit vulnerable girls. "Lolita" is a term of endearment from the book Lolita by Vladimir Nabokov
Luddite: An older person who resists new technology, especially digital technology; this term may be misused to refer to people with anti-establishment views (for example somebody who boycotts Amazon or refuses to own a mobile phone), whereas when applied to older people, the term takes on a more pejorative context describing an irrational fear or disdain towards new things caused by age alone, such as a fear of artificial intelligence taking jobs away. The term in any such case is a misuse of the term "luddite" in reference to a very specific subgroup of textiles workers with certain religious and philosophical beliefs about social order and new advancements in human culture

M 

Maggot(s) in the rice: a derogatory term in contemporary Chinese culture referring to baby girls; the term is typically associated with China's authoritarian "One Child Policy", which limited birth of children per family and also favoured male children. China's government has since implemented efforts to change this cultural phenomenon
Malingerer: An older person who lingers or routinely goes to hospitals and walk-in clinics with ailments, either real or imagined; the term has negative connotations of attention-seeking and mooching off the system
Mama-san: A term (often considered pejorative, outdated) referring to an older woman from East Asia in an authority position
Mammy: A term and social image, generally also perceived as racist, of a kindly old black woman who raises the children of the family employing her or keeping her in slavery; the elderly Mammy is often bizarrely placid, maternal, unquestioning and wise yet subservient
Man-child or Man-baby: A grown adult man who lives like a child or teenager typically would 
MILF: An acronym slang term meaning "mother I'd like to fuck"; generally considered sexist and ageist. Some women have reclaimed the term as a form of flattery and sexual self-expression, diversifying its context; for example, Medium journalist Octavia Morrison took the term as a compliment, arguing that being called a "MILF" suggested that she as an older woman and mother was still in sexual demand and physically attractive
Millennial: A generational demographic known for having grown up with the internet and the coming of the Digital Age; often used as an ageist political insult
Mrs. Robinson: Originating from the song "Mrs. Robinson" by Simon & Garfunkel; slang term referring to an older woman pursuing someone younger than herself, typically an adolescent male

N 
Niglet: Pejorative racial slur (derivative of the racial slur "nigger") used to describe black children; the term is extremely offensive in most contexts, as it stems from a broader slur linked with connotations of slavery and servitude
Nuisance: A derogatory term towards older people

O 

Okay, boomer: Originally a slang term used in left-wing politics to shut down opponents or pundits with a "boomer" (outdated, bigoted) opinion; the term raised concerns due to its ageist rhetoric, its lack of a clear definition (having been conflated with "Karen" and other American slang emerging in the midst of the COVID-19 pandemic), and the term's use to silence and exclude conservatives from political debates
Old bag / Old hag: An older, unappealing or ugly and lower-class woman
Old bat: A neurotic or senile older woman
Old bitch: A rude term for an older woman
Old cow: A rude term for an older woman, especially one who is overweight or obese and homely
Old fart: A boring and old-fashioned silly person
Old folks' home: A slang term, often considered insulting, for an assisted care facility or residence for older people
Old maid: An older unmarried lady; a widow 
Olderly: Newfoundland slang term for "elderly"; can be offensive or neutral depending on the context
Oldster: An offensive term that gained strong pejorative status during the COVID-19 pandemic; used to describe senior citizens affected by the pandemic
Out to pasture: Euphemism for retirement, likening retirement to putting a working livestock animal, such as an old horse or a cow, out to pasture for grazing
Over the hills: Age-related metaphor comparing aging through life to going over a hill; the term can be used jokingly and with good intent, and offence depends on the context in which it is used

P 

Pensioner: An older person living on an old-age pension; used as an insult to refer to aging people draining the welfare system
Peter Pan: A term describing a grown adult, typically a man, who behaves like a child or teenager and refuses, either actively or passively, to not act their true age 
Pickaninny: an American pejorative slang for a black child, considered extremely racist and dehumanizing
Pops: A condescending (depending on context) term for an older, out-of-touch man
Prostitot: A derogatory term for a minor who dresses provocatively in a trashy manner; portmanteau of "prostitute" and "toddler"
Prune: The term "prune", or comparing older people to prunes in general, is a common insult and often an intended joke; for example, in the Goosebumps episode "An Old Story", two teenage boys are given prune cookies that cause the boys to physically age into old men, after which their elderly aunt attempts to sell the boys to two little old ladies who want to marry them 
Psycho-biddy: An exploitation film genre featuring films about older women; the name of the genre is used in humour and is not generally intended to be offensive or derogatory
Punk: A misbehaved young person, not to be confused with punk subculture

S 

Second childhood: A term describing adults whose declining mental capabilities mean that they need care similar to that of young children, for example adults who are older and need help with tasks such as bathing, shopping, using the toilet and reading books
Senile: Senility; broad term (with some legitimate medical usage) referring to older people with declining mental capabilities
Sheng nu: A derogatory Chinese slang term loosely translating to "leftover women", used to describe unmarried older women 
Silver fox: A sexually-attractive or promiscuous older person, typically a woman 
Silver surfer: An older person who knows how to expertly use digital technology; "silver" refers to hair colour
Silver Wings Travel Club: An offensive euphemism for senior citizens travelling on a commercial airline flight
Sleepy Joe: A term that has been used by Donald Trump, among other figures, to mock the age of President Joe Biden; used to imply that he is senile or delicate due to his age. Various critics have called this term into question for its ageist implications
Spinster: A single woman who, in her own culture, is unmarried beyond the age at which most people get married

T 

Teenybopper: A term (often neutral) describing teenage girls and associated music, fashion, speech and other trends associated with that age group in a given generation; the term can be used to give a connotation that something is vapid or silly, such as a pop song or fad

W 

Whippersnapper: A young person who thinks they know more than they do, typically a teenager or young adult; a smartass
Witch: An older woman who is cranky, physically unattractive and bitter, who resembles a witch 
Wrinkle room: A term referring in gay culture to bars where old men congregate
Wrinkled old prune: A derogatory term referring to old people by way of their wrinkled skin and consumption of fiber, comparing them to dehydrated prunes

Y 

Young fogey: A British slang term referring to conservatively-dressed, young preppy men
Yubaba: A rude, pushy old woman in a position of power; originated from the 2001 Japanese animated Studio Ghibli film Spirited Away
Yuppie: An urban professional, typically of the 1980s era, a sellout; developed a pejorative connotation from the association with consumerism, gentrification and indifference towards sociopolitical issues
Yuppie flu: A pejorative term for chronic fatigue syndrome, originaing in the 1980s as a stereotype of people with CFS as frustrated  and spoiled young yuppies

Z 

Zoomer: Antonym of "boomer"; refers to younger people who went through school or their career using Zoom to communicate in the COVID-19 pandemic, as well as young people zooming through life, addicted to digital devices such as smartphones or working in technologically-integrated environments

See also 
 Ableism
 Age discrimination in the United States
 Age segregation
 Ageism
 Double standard of aging
 Elder abuse
 List of disability-related terms with negative connotations

Further reading 
 University of Bristol Style Guide to Inclusive writing – Age

References 

Ageism
Bullying
Discrimination
Elderly care
Lists of pejorative terms for people
Lists of slang
Vulnerable adults